Buckingham is an English toponymic surname from Buckingham.

Notable people with the surname include:

 A. David Buckingham, British physical chemist
 Catharinus P. Buckingham, American Civil War general
 Carmel Buckingham, Slovak-American singer
 Celeste Buckingham, Slovak recording artist of Swiss-American origins
 Delsworth Buckingham (1866-1951), American politician
 Des Buckingham, English football manager
 Edgar Buckingham, creator of the Buckingham π theorem, a key theorem in dimensional analysis
 Edward Taylor Buckingham, III, former CNMI Attorney General 
 James Silk Buckingham, oriental traveller
 Jane Buckingham (born 1968), American author and businesswoman
 John Buckingham (chemist), British chemist 
 John Buckingham (cricketer), English cricketer
 John Buckingham (jockey) (1940–2016), English horse racing jockey 
 Leicester Silk Buckingham, playwright
 Lilia Buckingham (born 2003), American actress and Internet personality
 Lindsey Buckingham, American rock musician and member of Fleetwood Mac
 Marcus Buckingham (born 1966), British author, business consultant, and motivational speaker
 Owen Buckingham, (1674–1720) English politician
 Sir Owen Buckingham, (c. 1649 – 1713) English MP and Lord Mayor of London
 Steve Buckingham (record producer), American record producer and musician
 Vic Buckingham, British football player and coach
 Wayne Buckingham, former New Zealand Men's Hockey right full back (1978–1981) and part of the 1980 New Zealand Men's Hockey Olympic team.
 William Alfred Buckingham, former governor of Connecticut

See also

 The Duke of Buckingham, a title of British peerage
 Earl of Buckingham, a title of British peerage
 Bearers of both titles might be referred to as "Buckingham"   

English toponymic surnames